The men's water polo tournament at the 2019 World Aquatics Championships, organised by the FINA, was held in Gwangju, South Korea from 15 to 27 July. This was the eighteenth time that the men's water polo tournament has been played since the first edition in 1973.

Italy defeated Spain in the final to win their fourth title, while Croatia won against Hungary to capture the bronze medal.

Participating teams

Draw
The draw was held on 7 April 2019.

Seeding
The seedings were announced on 6 February 2019.

Groups formed
The draw resulted in the following groups:

Preliminary round
All times are local (UTC+9).

Group A

Group B

Group C

Group D

Knockout stage

Bracket
Championship bracket

5th place bracket

9th place bracket

13th place bracket

Playoffs

Quarterfinals

13th–16th place semifinals

9th–12th place semifinals

5th–8th place semifinals

Semifinals

15th place game

13th place game

Eleventh place game

Ninth place game

Seventh place game

Fifth place game

Third place game

Final

Final ranking

Medalists

Awards and statistics

Top goalscorers

Awards
The awards and all-star team were announced on 26 July 2019.

Most Valuable Player
 Francesco Di Fulvio

Most Valuable Goalkeeper
 Daniel López

Highest Goalscorer
 Aleksandar Ivović – 21 goals

Media All-Star Team
 Daniel López – Goalkeeper
 Roger Tahull – Centre forward
 Francesco Di Fulvio
 Aleksandar Ivović
 Maro Joković
 Dušan Mandić
 Gergő Zalánki

References

External links
 18th FINA World Championships 2019 FINA Water Polo website
Records and statistics (reports by Omega)
 Men Water Polo XVIII World Championship 2019 Gwuangju, South Korea www.todor66.com

2019
Men